

The voyage 
The Fortune was 1/3 the size of the Mayflower, displacing 55 tons. The Master was Thomas Barton. She departed London in the fall of 1621 and arrived off Cape Cod on November 9, 1621, and arrived in Plymouth Bay by the end of the month. The ship only stayed at Plymouth about three weeks loading cargo, and departed for England on December 13, 1621. About January 19, 1622, due to a navigation error, Fortune was overtaken and seized by a French warship, with those on board being held under guard in France for about a month and with its cargo taken. Fortune finally arrived back in the Thames on February 17, 1622.

Passenger count 
The identification of passengers comes largely from the 1623 Division of Land list and its distribution of lots as transcribed by William Bradford. From that list comes the following Fortune passenger list comprised from the works of authors Charles Banks and Edward Stratton based on their research as well as author Caleb Johnson with his information based directly on the 1623 Division of Land. Author Edward Stratton also has the list as written by Bradford in the language/spelling of the time. There are children listed here which were most likely not part of the original passenger count of 35. A number of persons listed in 1623 do not appear in the 1627 Division of Cattle list and this may be due to death, removal to an area outside the colony or a return to England.

Additionally, 15 of those men (of 58 total) were included in a historic 1626 agreement regarding Mayflower and other debts owed by the colony to the Merchant Adventurers which were reorganized and taken over largely by the colony itself under a creditor group known as the “Purchasers” . In 1627 the debts and shares in the company were assigned in to 8 Plymouth colony leaders and 4 Merchant Adventurers, all known as “Undertakers.” Those 15 Purchasers are identified on the passenger list.

And although Bradford notes that thirty-five persons were on Fortune, only the names of twenty-eight persons are listed as receiving lots in 1623. Eighteen persons are known to have been unmarried, eight married but emigrating without their families, and as far as can be determined, Mrs. Martha Ford and Elizabeth Bassett wife of William Bassett were the only women on the ship. Records indicate that sixteen of the passengers were from the London area and three from Leiden. The origins of ten passengers could not be determined.

Passengers 
 John Adams – One acre allocated in 1623 land division. He was a carpenter and was born in England c1600. Later married Ellen Newton who came on the Anne in 1623. He had three children with Ellen, James, John, and Susana. Member of the 1626 Purchaser investment group. In 1627 cattle division with wife “Eliner” and son James. He died in 1633 in Plymouth and in 1634 his widow Ellen married Kenelem Winslow, brother of Mayflower passenger Edward Winslow.
 William Bassett (Basset) - Supposedly single upon arrival, but allocation of two shares in 1623 land division as “William Bassite”, per Banks, indicates he had taken a wife before that date. Member of 1626 Purchaser investment group as “Willm. Basset.” The 1627 cattle division lists the “Basset” family: “Willm”, Elizabeth, and children “Willyam junor” and “Elyzabeth junor.”
 Elizabeth Bassett (wife) – based on 1623 land division of two shares for William Bassett.
 William Beale – Single in 1623 land division and shared two acres with Thomas Cushman. Not listed in 1627 cattle division. No further record in Plymouth.
 Edward Bompasse (Bumpas) – Single upon arrival and, per Bradford, was one of the “lusty yonge men” who arrived on the Fortune. In the 1623 land division as “Edward Bompass.” Member of 1626 Purchaser investment group as “Edward Bumpas.” In 1627 cattle division as “Edward Bumpasse.” In 2009, Jeremy Dupertuis Bangs speculated that Edward was "probably a Walloon." George Willison, in his work "Saints and Strangers: in 1945, called Edward a "Native Leydener." Died c.1683/84.
 Jonathan Brewster – Born 1593, eldest son of Elder William Brewster. One acre in 1623 land division as a single man. In 1624 married Lucretia Oldham, daughter of Walter “Ouldham,” who came on the Anne in 1623. Member of the 1626 Purchaser investment group. In 1627 cattle division the family was listed as “Johnathan”, “Lucrecia” and children “Willm” and Mary.
 Clement Briggs – A fellmonger (hide dealer). In 1616 resided in Southwark, London, with Robert Hicks, fellow Fortune passenger. Single upon arrival and received one acre in the 1623 land division as “Clemente Brigges.” Member of the 1626 Purchaser investment group. In 1627 cattle division as “Clemont Briggs.”
 John Cannon – No record in Plymouth. Single upon arrival and one acre in the 1623 land division. Not listed in 1627 cattle division. Stratton reports he appeared in a 1638 Plymouth land record with William Tench. No record in Plymouth. Single upon arrival and one acre in the 1623 land division. Not listed in 1627 cattle division. Stratton reports he appeared in a 1638 Plymouth land record with William Tench.
 William Conner (Coner) – Single upon arrival and one acre in the 1623 land division as “William Coner.” Not listed in the 1627 cattle division and does not appear further in colony records.
 Robert Cushman – Robert Cushman – A Leiden church leader and their 1620 London agent for the ship Mayflower. Came on a mission to have the Merchant Adventurer-Mayflower financial agreement finally approved by the Pilgrim leadership. Stayed only a few weeks to complete that project and went back to England on the Fortune return trip. Left his son Thomas with William Bradford.
 Thomas Cushman – Born c.1607/1608. Son of Robert who remained at Plymouth after his father returned to England on the Fortune in 1621. In 1623 land division shared 2 acres with William Beale. Member of the 1626 Purchaser investment group as “Thom. Cushman.” In the 1627 cattle division with the Bradford family and sometime after that married Mary, daughter of Pilgrim Isaac Allerton. She would be the longest lived Mayflower passenger. In 1649 he succeeded Elder William Brewster as Ruling Elder of the Plymouth Church. 
 Stephen Deane - Single on arrival and received one acre in the 1623 land division as “Steuen Dean.” Member of the 1626 Purchaser investment group as “Steeven Deane.” In the 1627 cattle division. Married Elizabeth Ring from Leiden in 1627 sometime after division. Died 1634. 
 Philip Delano - (Phillipe De La Noye) – Age about 16 upon arrival. In 1623 land division shared 2 acres with Moses (Moyses) Simonson. Member of the 1626 Purchaser investment group as “Phillip Delanoy.” In 1627 cattle division with the Francis Cooke family also as “Phillip Delanoy.” Married Hester Dewsbury in 1634. Died 1681/2
 Thomas Flavel – One of the older married passengers who came with a son of unknown name. In 1623 land division he and his unnamed son received two shares and were listed as “Thomas Flauell & his son.” His wife Elizabeth came on the Anne in 1623 and appears with one acre in the 1623 land division with Anne passengers as “goodwife Flauell.” The family is not in the 1627 cattle division. 
 (unknown name) Flavel – Son of Thomas Flavel – per 1623 land division.
 (unknown name) Ford – Husband of Martha with two children. He was a passenger on the Fortune who may have died prior to or shortly after the ship reached port. He apparently had a share In the 1623 land division under “Widow Foord,” when the 4 members of this family – husband (deceased), wife Martha, son John and daughter Martha received 4 acres. This unknown Ford man and Martha had a third child in November of 1621, likely in Plymouth or on Cape Cod. It is commonly assumed that this child was William Ford, who became a deacon of Marshfield, but this is not true since the child died before the age of six.
 Martha Ford – Widow of Fortune passenger William Ford. In the 1623 land division the family was assigned 4 lots under her name as “Widow Foord.” In 1626 she married Mayflower passenger Peter Browne. In 1627 cattle division the family appears as “Peeter” and Martha Browne, with her Ford children John and Martha “fford.” She died by 1630.
 Martha Ford – Born c.1619, daughter of William and Martha Ford. Married 29 October 1640 to William Nelson.
 John Ford – Born c. 1617, son of William and Martha Ford. Died between 1640 and 1643.
 Robert Hicks (Hix) – Born about 1570. In 1616 he was a fellmonger (hide dealer) residing in Southwark, London. Married, but arrived as a single man as had only one lot in the 1623 land division as “Robart Hickes.” Member of the 1626 Purchaser investment group as “Robte. Hicks.” His wife Margaret and two children arrived on the Anne in 1623. In the 1627 cattle division the “Hickes” family, Robert and “Margret,”appear with their four children. He died in 1647.
 William Hilton – Son of William and Ellen Hilton of Northwich, co. Chester, where he lived with his wife and children 1616-1620. At the time of emigration he was a London resident with his brother Edward. Arrived as a single man with only one lot in the 1623 land division. His wife and two children came over on the Anne in 1623 and appear in the land division for Anne passengers as:”William Hiltons wife & .2. children”. The family was not in the 1627 cattle division. Per Banks the family moved to New Hampshire in 1623/4 where his brother Edward Hilton founded the city of Dover.
 Benedict Morgan – A sailor born in 1597. In 1619 married Agnes Porter. Resident of St. James, Clerkenwell, London, when he emigrated. He came as a single man and had one lot in the 1623 land division as “Benet Morgan.” Went back in 1623 on the ship Anne with its return voyage to England. He did not return to New England. He died in 1630.
 Thomas Morton – Possibly born c.1589. Came alone and had one share of land in the 1623 division. Brother of George Morton and father of Thomas Morton Junior who came in 1623 on the Little James and Anne respectively. Member of the 1626 Purchaser investment group as “Thom. Morton.” Not listed in 1627 division and may have died about then.
 Augustine (Austen) Nicolas – No family record in Plymouth. Received one acre as a single man in the 1623 land division as “Austen Nicolas.” Not listed in 1627 and may have died or left the colony.
 William Palmer – He was one of the older passengers, born in 1582. He was a nailer by profession. He came with his son William Jr, and received two acres in the 1623 land division for passengers on the Fortune., while his wife Francis received 1 acre as a passenger on the Anne, arrived 1623, under “ffrance wife to Wil Palmer.”.  Member of the 1626 Purchase investment group as “Willm. Palmer.”  In 1627 his wife Frances and son William shared in the division of cattle list as “William Pallmer,” wife “ffrances” and son “Willm Pallmer Jnor.” He died in Duxbury, November, 1637.
 William Pitt – No record in Plymouth. Came as a single man and drew one lot in the 1623 land division sharing 2 lots with William Wright. Not listed in the 1627 cattle division.
 Thomas Prence – Prince being the surname of his forebears. He came as a single man about age 20 and had one lot in the 1623 land division. Member of the 1626 Purchaser investment group as “Mr. Thom. Prence.” Married in 1624 Patience, daughter of Mayflower passenger and Elder William Brewster. She died in 1634. In 1627 cattle division his family is listed as “Prince” with Thomas, “Pacience,” and daughter “Rebecka.” Prence was one of the most notable Fortune passengers, with a long career in colony politics and being a long-term Plymouth Colony governor. 
 Moses Simonson – He was a Dutch member of the Leiden English Separatist church. No other origin information. He came as a single man, possibly a minor, receiving two acres in the 1623 land division as “Moyses Simonson” which he shared with Philipe de la Noye. Member of the 1626 Purchaser investment group as “Moyses Symonson.” In 1627 cattle division as “Moyses Simonson” he shared 2 acres with Philipe de la Noye.
 Hugh Stacie – He was a yeoman (farmer/land holder). Nothing is known of his origins. He came over as a single man and possibly an apprentice as was not a freeman until 1642. Listed as “Hugh Statie” in the 1623 land division with one lot. Not listed in the 1627 cattle division.
 James Steward – Either unmarried or without his family on arrival as only one lot assigned to him in the 1623 land division. No record after 1623.
 William Tench – Nothing is known about him prior to emigration. Single upon arrival and shared 2 acres with John Cannon in the 1623 land division. Not listed after 1627 although there is a record of a 1638 Plymouth land sale with John Cannon.
 John Winslow – Born c.1597. He was of Droitwich, co. Worcester. Single upon arrival and drew one lot in the 1623 land division. Member of the 1626 Purchaser investment group with his brother, Mayflower passenger Edward Winslow. By 1627 he had married Mary Chilton, a Mayflower passenger and daughter of James Chilton, he being one of the earliest to die after the Mayflower arrival at Cape Cod. In the 1627 cattle division Winslow is listed with his wife Mary in Lot 6 with the Adams, “Basset” and “Sprage” families. 
 William Wright – One of the oldest of the passengers, born about 1588. He came alone on the ship and received two acres in the 1623 Land Division which he shared with William Pitt. His wife was Priscilla Carpenter, daughter of Alexander Carpenter and his wife Priscilla of Wrington, co. Somerset in England and Leiden, Holland. They married in Plymouth sometime after the 1627 Division of the Cattle when he was still a single man, listed in Lot 4 with the Howland family. Priscilla’s sister Alice came on the Anne in 1623 and soon after arrival married Governor William Bradford in August 1623. Another sister Juliann came on the Little James in 1623 as the wife of George Morton. Wright had a close relationship with both his brothers-in-law Governor Bradford and Samuel Fuller all being associated with the Leiden church before emigration. He was a member of the 1626 Purchaser investment group and was listed as “Willm. Wright.” In his will the tools listed indicate he may have been a skilled woodworker. He died before November 6, 1633 and about a year later, on November 27, 1634, his wife Priscilla married John Cooper, who may have arrived in Plymouth in 1630 on the White Angel.

References

Bibliography 
Charles Edward Banks, The English Ancestry and Homes of the Pilgrim Fathers: who came to Plymouth on the "Mayflower" in 1620, the "Fortune" in 1621, and the "Anne" and the "Little James" in 1623 (Baltimore: Genealogical Publishing Co., 2006), listed biographies of all Fortune passengers - pages 105-131.
Eugene Aubrey Stratton, Plymouth Colony: Its History and People, 1620-1691 (Salt Lake City: Ancestry Publishing, 1986), 
The 1623 Division of Land (Fortune passengers) – pp. 415-417
The 1626 Purchasers – pp. 419-420
The 1627 Division of Cattle – pp. 421-426
Caleb H. Johnson, The Mayflower and her passengers (Indiana:Xlibris Corp., Caleb Johnson, 2006):
The 1623 Division of Land (Fortune passengers) – pp. 267, 269
The 1627 Division of Cattle – pp. 271-275
The Great Migration Begins: Immigrants to New England 1620-1633, Volumes I-III. (Online database: AmericanAncestors.org, New England Historic Genealogical Society, 2010), (Originally Published as: New England Historic Genealogical Society. Robert Charles Anderson, The Great Migration Begins: Immigrants to New England 1620-1633, Volumes I-III, 3 vols., 1995).
Mrs. John E Barclay, "Goodwife Martha Ford and Her Alias 'Widow' Ford, Her Second Husband, Peter Brown, and Her Children." The American Genealogist. New Haven, CT: D. L. Jacobus, 1937-. (Online database. AmericanAncestors.org. New England Historic Genealogical Society, 2009 - .)

Massachusetts culture
Plymouth Colony
Plymouth, Massachusetts
Pre-statehood history of Massachusetts